Jenna Leigh Green (born August 22, 1974) is an American actress and singer best known for her performances as Libby Chessler on the television show Sabrina the Teenage Witch, as well as for roles on tour in the musical Wicked and later in the Broadway production.

Early life and career
Green was born  Jennifer Leigh Greenberg in West Hills, California to an actress mother and a musician father. She was raised in Simi Valley, California with her twin sister Jessica and younger sister Becca in a family of actors and musicians. She began to perform in school and community theatre productions by age 12 and later began to appear in commercials and television programs, as well as a few made-for-TV movies.

After graduating from Simi Valley High School, Green appeared for several seasons as Libby Chessler in the television series Sabrina, the Teenage Witch beginning in 1996. She also performed in guest spots on television shows like ER and Dharma & Greg and participated in other Nickelodeon events such as The Big Help and the game show Figure It Out.

Theatre career and later work
Her Los Angeles theatre experience includes The Wizard of Oz, The Secret Garden, The Fantasticks, Romeo and Juliet, Into the Woods, and West Side Story.

In 1999, Green was cast as Ivy in Bare: A Pop Opera. She performed in the original reading for the musical as well as the original Los Angeles Productions. In 2002, she appeared in the TV movie First Shot. She also performed with the Pussycat Dolls when they were a feature burlesque show at The Roxy Theatre. In 2004, she moved to New York City where she again played Ivy in Bare during its brief off-Broadway run. In 2007, the cast album of Bare was released, featuring Green. Also in 2004, she performed in concerts and benefits with other cast members as well as on her own. She performed as Diana in a workshop of a new musical, Mask.  In 2005, Green played Betty in the musical film Open House.

Green then became a cast member of the musical Wicked. She opened the role of Nessarose, on the First North American Tour, which opened March 2005. She also understudied the lead role of Elphaba, and as a result, played the role over 40 times.She exited the tour on March 5, 2006, and transferred to the Broadway production of the show, marking her Broadway debut. She reprised the role of Nessarose through December 31, 2006, before playing the role once again in the original Los Angeles production from February through December 2007. She was replaced by Marcie Dodd, who later became the Elphaba standby.

Green starred as Sally Simpson in a production of The Who's Tommy at the Ricardo Montalban Theatre in Hollywood which ran from June 18 – July 6, 2008.

In 2008, Green appeared as Violet Golding in the episode of Cold Case titled "Wednesday's Women".

On September 21, 2008, Green made her West End debut in "Never Neverland" a benefit concert that helped in aid of Ovarian cancer and NCH. The concert was at the Duchess Theatre in London. Alongside Green was fellow Wicked alumni Eden Espinosa and Scott Alan. On February 27, 2009 she guest starred on the CBS series Ghost Whisperer as Carrie in episode 4.16 "Ghost Busted".

In the fall of 2010 she appeared in the concert revue "For The Record: Quentin Tarantino" in Los Angeles, presented by ROCKLA for Show at Barre. It ran from August 12, 2010, to October 30, 2010. Also starring Tracie Thoms, Autumn Reeser, Ty Taylor, and Audra Mae.

She appeared at Show at Barre. It opened on February 12, 2011, and closed on June 30, 2011. Also starring were Tracie Thoms, Arielle Jacobs and Kate Reinders.

In 2014 she starred in the Off-Broadway Musical "The Anthem". Co-starring with Green were Randy Jones, Remy Zaken, Ashley Kate Adams, and Jason Gotay. The production was directed and choreographed by Rachel Klein, with a book by Gary Morgenstein, lyrics by Erik Ransom, and music by Jonnie Rockwell. The production performed at the Lynn Redgrave Theatre in New York City. 
 

She also appeared in a Bones episode "The Change in the Game", and in Castle in the episode "Sucker Punch".

Filmography

References

External links

List of additional Green credits

1974 births
20th-century American actresses
21st-century American actresses
Actresses from California
American musical theatre actresses
American stage actresses
American television actresses
Living people
People from Simi Valley, California
American twins
People from West Hills, Los Angeles